Derlin-2 is a protein that in humans is encoded by the DERL2 gene.

See also 
 Derlin-1
 Derlin-3

References

Further reading